Paranerita diversa is a moth of the subfamily Arctiinae. It was described by Walter Rothschild in 1917. It is found in Venezuela.

References

Paranerita
Moths described in 1917